Greatest Hits Radio Yorkshire is a radio station regional sub-network serving Yorkshire, Lincolnshire & the North Midlands as part of Bauer’s Greatest Hits Radio network. Whilst all programming is shared either across the region, or nationally, the local areas which were formerly separate stations retain local identities (e.g. GHR West Yorkshire), with local news, travel updates, weather forecasts and advertising. It is not possible therefore to listen to a station branded "Greatest Hits Radio Yorkshire".

History
Under relaxed OFCOM requirements for local content on commercial radio, Greatest Hits Radio is permitted to share all programming between thirteen licences located in the ITV Yorkshire broadcast region.

Prior to the launch of Greatest Hits Radio Yorkshire, there were four medium-wave stations:
 Viking Gold, a separate service from Viking Radio, began broadcasting to the East Riding of Yorkshire and North Lincolnshire on 31 October 1988.
 Classic Gold, a separate service from Radio Hallam, began broadcasting to South Yorkshire and the North Midlands on 1 May 1989.
 Magic 828, a separate service from Radio Aire, began broadcasting to Leeds and West Yorkshire on 17 July 1990.
Pulse 2 began broadcasting as Pennine Radio to Bradford in September 1975, later expanding to Calderdale and Kirklees.

Ten local FM licences are folded into the regional station:

Radio Aire began broadcasting to Leeds and West Yorkshire on 1 September 1981.
Minster FM began broadcasting to York and surrounding areas in July 1992, extending to the Thirsk and Northallerton area four years later.
Yorkshire Coast Radio began broadcasting to Scarborough, Whitby and surrounding areas in November 1993, before expanding to the Bridlington area in November 1999.
Stray FM began broadcasting to Harrogate and Ripon in July 1994, before expanding to the Yorkshire Dales in January 2012. 
Peak FM began broadcasting to north Derbyshire in October 1998.
Trax FM began broadcasting in November 1998, initially providing separate services to Doncaster and Bassetlaw.
 Ridings FM began broadcasting to Wakefield in October 1999.
Compass FM began broadcasting to Grimsby in June 2001.
Dearne FM began broadcasting to Barnsley and the Dearne Valley in October 2003.
Rother FM began broadcasting to Rotherham in October 2006.

In May 2020, Bauer announced it would merge the AM and FM stations to form the Greatest Hits Radio Yorkshire sub-network as part of a wider restructuring of its local radio stations.

On 16 July 2020, Bauer announced Radio Aire would close and switch from the Hits Radio network to GHR, merging with the aforementioned stations in Yorkshire and Lincolnshire.

The regional station launched on 1 September 2020.

A single DAB-only station for Lincolnshire launched in November 2020.

Regional programming
Regional programming is produced and broadcast from Bauer's Leeds studios from 1-4pm on weekdays, presented by Steve Priestley.

News
Bauer’s Leeds, Scarborough and Lincoln newsrooms broadcast local news bulletins hourly from 6am to 7pm on weekdays and from 7am to 1pm at weekends. Headlines are broadcast on the half-hour during weekday breakfast and drivetime shows, alongside traffic bulletins.

Separate local news and traffic bulletins are produced for the following areas:
The former Minster FM, Stray FM and Yorkshire Coast Radio licence areas of North Yorkshire and a second split service for the FM frequencies only in Scarborough, Whitby and Bridlington
East Yorkshire, North Lincolnshire and North East Lincolnshire covering Viking FM and the former Compass FM areas
The ex-Pulse 2 licence area (Bradford, Kirklees and Calderdale) and ex-Radio Aire and Ridings FM licence areas of Leeds and Wakefield
South Yorkshire

Bauer produces its own England and Wales national bulletins on weekend (and public holidays) afternoons. National bulletins from Sky News Radio are carried at other times.

See also
 Greatest Hits Radio Teesside, a sister station also Broadcasting in Yorkshire (North Riding). It also broadcasts in the county to the north of Yorkshire in County Durham).

References

External links
 

Bauer Radio
Greatest Hits Radio
Radio stations established in 2020